Ildo Enrique Maneiro Ghezzi (born 4 August 1947) is a Uruguayan former professional football (soccer) player and manager.

He played for Uruguay at the 1970 FIFA World Cup, Nacional, Olympique Lyonnais and C.A. Peñarol. He capped 33 times for his country, scoring 3 goals.

He went on to become coach of Real Zaragoza.

External links

1947 births
Living people
People from Mercedes, Uruguay
Uruguayan footballers
Uruguay international footballers
Uruguayan expatriate footballers
Association football midfielders
Club Nacional de Football players
Olympique Lyonnais players
Uruguayan Primera División players
Ligue 1 players
Expatriate footballers in France
Peñarol players
1970 FIFA World Cup players
Uruguayan football managers
Uruguayan expatriate football managers
Real Zaragoza managers
Uruguay national football team managers
C.S. Herediano managers
Expatriate football managers in Spain
Expatriate football managers in Costa Rica
Uruguayan expatriate sportspeople in Spain
Danubio F.C. managers
River Plate Montevideo managers
C.A. Rentistas managers
C.A. Progreso managers
C.A. Bella Vista managers